Yaduvanshi  is a term used for describing various Rajput clans. Prominent among them are Bhatis, Jadejas, Sammas and Chudasamas.

Several inscriptions links the Chudasamas to Yadavas of the legendary Lunar dynasty. According to these, Chudasamas were a branch of the Samma lineage that acquired the principality of Vanthali from the local ruler and subsequently occupied the already fortified city of Junagadh. Later inscriptions and the text Mandalika-Nripa-Charita link them to the Yadava family of the Hindu deity Krishna.

Samira Sheikh says that Chudasama were originally pastoralists. She adds that, the Jadejas , Chudasamas , Bhatis  and Sammas originate from four brothersAspat, Gajpat, Narpat and Bhupatwho descended from Krishna. This mythologised genealogy claims that the brothers first together conquered Egypt. After the Islamic conquest, Aspat converted to Islam and founded the Samma dynasty; then Gajpat conquered Ghazni; Bhupat established Bhatner; and Narpat, after first founding Nagar-Samoi in Sindh, became ancestor of Chandracuda, the first Chudasama ruler. Similar claims with slightly different details have been recorded by past Indologists including Tod, Burgess, Desai and Rayjada. In addition, Tuhfat al Kiram, used by Elliot and Dowson in their History of India, records an Islamicised version of the myth.

References

Rajputs
Rajput clans of Gujarat
Rajput clans of Bihar
Rajput clans of Rajasthan
Rajput clans of Himachal Pradesh
Rajput clans of Madhya Pradesh
Hindu communities